NBC Studios may refer to:

 NBC Studios (New York City), 30 Rockefeller Plaza in Manhattan, home of NBC TV, NBCUniversal, MSNBC, WNBC
 10 Universal City Plaza in Los Angeles, home of NBCUniversal Cable Entertainment
 NBC Tower, office building in Chicago
 The Burbank Studios, television production facility in Burbank, California
 NBC Studios (production company), former television production company